Adrian Arendt (born 20 August 1952) is a Romanian sailor. He competed in the Flying Dutchman event at the 1980 Summer Olympics.

References

External links
 
 

1952 births
Living people
Romanian male sailors (sport)
Olympic sailors of Romania
Sailors at the 1980 Summer Olympics – Flying Dutchman
Place of birth missing (living people)